Kim Min-seo (born April 18, 2009) is a South Korean child actress and model. Kim known for her roles in drama series Hometown Cha-Cha-Cha (2021) and family drama Young Lady and Gentleman (2021).

Kim is also active as model for many advertisements. She is also known as one of the cast members of ODG, a South Korean kids YouTube Channel.

Career
Kim began her career as a child fashion model in commercials. Kim joined acting academy at the age of 8 years old and debuted in minor role for short film Polaroid (2017). On August 26, 2017, she joined audition for new actors to appear in a short film produced by JTBC All Spectators. She passed the audition and got role as Min-ju in short film Spiderman (2017) which was directed by award-winning director Park Kwang-hyun.

In 2019, Kim got her next role in independent film, Maggie, by director Lee Ok-seop and screenwriter Koo Kyo-hwan. She acted as young version of Moon So-ri character, Lee Kyeong-jin. She acted in her first commercial film, a historical comedy directed by Kim Joo-Ho, Jesters: The Game Changers. In the same year, Kim also joined as cast member of ODG, a children South Korean YouTube Channel by Studio Solfa. 

In 2019 Kim started to audition for roles in television and managed to get minor role in OCN drama Save Me 2 (2019). In 2020, Kim appeared in minor roles in three dramas, Hospital Playlist (2020),  (2020) and Delayed Justice (2020). ODG, supported her career with content titled Kid Actress to Her Career which featured Kim’s reaction to her career as child-actress. On April 2, 2021, the channel released Kid tries not to recognize her favourite K-pop star, which featured Kim and her favourite K-pop singer and actress, IU. Kim re-enacted scene performed by IU in drama My Mister and explained to her role model IU on how that helped her career as actress.

Kim's first major supporting role in television was in 2021 tvN drama series Hometown Cha-Cha-Cha. She played Oh Ju-ri, a fourteen-years-old girl, only daughter of a widower Oh Chun-jae, a cafe owner in Gongjin. Her role as an avid fan of fictional idol group DOS in the drama, allowed Kim to show her talent in singing and acting. Due to popularity of Oh Ju-ri, Kim was appointed as public relations ambassador for the 2nd Gimpo Youth Film Festival for three years. She also invited to be award host in The 11th Gaon Chart Music Awards, together with actor Jo Han-chul, who played as her father in the drama. Aside of Hometown Cha-Cha-Cha, Kim appeared in the KBS2 weekend family drama Young Lady and Gentleman opposite Ji Hyun-woo, in which she played the younger version of Park Dan-dan, played by Lee Se-hee as an adult. In omnibus feature film New Year Blues, Kim acted opposite Kim Kang-woo as his daughter.

In 2022, Kim made several television appearances. In KBS2 miniseries Café Minamdang, Kim portrayed young Han Jae-hui, the role portrayed by Oh Yeon-seo as adult. Also in 2022, Kim got her first title role as archer Eun-ho in the Korean version of 'Fair Training' part of EBS Omnibus Drama Beast of Asia Season 2. The drama was aired in cable channel ENA and went viral in Netflix Korea. Kim was featured in the second episode of the first season of SBS drama series The First Responders as middle school student Kim Hyeon-seo. For her performances, Kim won Best Young Actress in 2022 SBS Drama Awards.

Filmography

Short film

Feature film

Television series
{| class="wikitable sortable plainrowheaders"
|+List of television series performances
! scope="col" rowspan="2"| Year
! scope="col" colspan="2"| Title
! scope="col" rowspan="2"| Role
! scope="col" rowspan="2"| Notes
! rowspan="2" scope="col" class="unsortable" | 
|-
! English
! Korean
|-
! scope="row"| 2019
| Save Me 2
| 구해줘 2
| Kim Young-sun
| Young Version; Ep. 1,4-5
| 
|-
! scope="row" rowspan="3"|2020
| Hospital Playlist
| 슬기로운 의사생활
| Tae-hee
| Patient role; Ep.9
| 
|-
| 
| 찬란한_내_인생
| Im Se-ra
| 
| 
|-
| Delayed Justice
| 날아라 개천용
| Jung Myung-hee
| 
| 
|-
! scope="row" |2021
| Hometown Cha-Cha-Cha
| 갯마을 차차차
| Oh Ju-ri
| 
| 
|-
! scope="row" |2021–2022
| Young Lady and Gentleman
| 신사와 아가씨
| Park Dan-dan
| Young Version
|
|-
! rowspan="4" scope="row" |2022
| Café Minamdang
| 미남당
| Han Jae-hee
| Young Version
| 
|-
|Beasts of Asia Season 2
|비스트 오브 아시아 2
|Eun-ho
|
|
|-
||구필수는 없다
|Kim Ji-hyun 
|
|
|-
| The First Responders| 소방서 옆 경찰서
| Kim Hyeon-seo
| Cameo  (ep 2)
| 
|}

 Web series 

 Ambassador 

 2021 to 2024: Public relations ambassador for the 2nd Gimpo Youth Film Festival.''

Awards and nominations

References

External links 
 
 
  
 
 

Living people
People from Seoul
Actresses from Seoul
2009 births
South Korean child actresses
21st-century South Korean actresses
South Korean film actresses
South Korean television actresses